The fourth HMS Cleopatra was a  light cruiser of the Royal Navy that saw service during World War I and the Russian Civil War.  She was part of the Caroline group of the C class.

Construction
Constructed by Devonport Dockyard, Cleopatra was laid down on 26 February 1914, launched on 14 January 1915, and completed in June 1915.

Service history

World War I
Commissioned into service in the Royal Navy in June 1915, Cleopatra was assigned to the 5th Light Cruiser Squadron in Harwich Force, which operated in the North Sea to guard the eastern approaches to the Strait of Dover and English Channel. In 1915, she was fitted with a runway on her forecastle to launch French-made Royal Naval Air Service monoplanes to attack German airships flying over the North Sea, but the aircraft proved unable to achieve the altitude necessary to attack the airships, and the runway had been removed by early 1916.  In August 1915, she took part in the hunt in the North Sea for the Imperial German Navy auxiliary cruiser . In February 1916, she replaced the recently lost light cruiser  as flagship for Harwich Forces commander, Commodore Reginald Tyrwhitt. She was part of the force covering  a Royal Naval Air Service seaplane raid against the Imperial German Navy airship hangars at Tondern, then in northern Germany, on 24 March 1916 and, during the return journey, sighted the German destroyer  ahead of her. She turned toward G 194 and rammed her, cutting the destroyer in half and sinking her immediately, but the maneuver took Cleopatra across the bows of the light cruiser , and the two cruisers collided; Cleopatra returned to base with the force despite the damage she suffered in the two collisions, but Undaunted was so badly damaged that it took her four days to reach port.

Cleopatra completed repairs and returned to service in time to take part in Royal Navy operations opposing the Lowestoft Raid – a German naval bombardment of Yarmouth and Lowestoft – on 24–25 April 1916, and was part of the force under Commodore Tyrwhitt that found the German battlecruisers carrying out the raid. She was involved in an engagement with German destroyers in the North Sea on 18 July 1916. On 4 August 1916, she struck a mine off Thornton Ridge off the coast of Belgium, but soon returned to action after repairs.

In January 1917, Cleopatra participated in an unsuccessful operation to attack German destroyers off the Belgian coast. She underwent modernisation during 1917, and in October 1917 joined the other Harwich Force cruisers in a patrol zone to intercept any German attempt to intercept convoys steaming to and from Scandinavia. She was assigned to the 7th Light Cruiser Squadron of the Grand Fleet in August 1918 as squadron flagship, and served in that capacity through the end of World War I in November 1918 and until March 1919.

Postwar
After leaving the 7th Light Cruiser Squadron in March 1919, Cleopatra rejoined the 2nd Light Cruiser Squadron in April 1919 and served in the Baltic Sea from 1919 to 1920 during the British campaign there against Bolshevik and German forces during the Russian Civil War. After returning to the United Kingdom, she recommissioned in October 1920 to serve in the Atlantic Fleet. She was decommissioned in 1921 and placed in the Nore Reserve.

Cleopatra recommissioned in 1923 to serve in the 3rd Light Cruiser Squadron, then entered the Devonport Reserve in 1924. She again recommissioned in January 1925 and was assigned to the 2nd Light Cruiser Squadron in the Atlantic Fleet, serving until decommissioned again in December 1926 and placed under dockyard control. In December 1927, she commissioned into the Nore Reserve, and was its flagship from September 1928 to March 1931. While in the Nore Reserve, she transported troops to the Mediterranean in October 1928 and to China in 1929. In March 1931, she was decommissioned and placed under dockyard control at Chatham Dockyard.

Disposal
Cleopatra was sold on 26 June 1931 to Hughes Bolckow of Blyth, Northumberland, for scrapping.

Notes

References

External links

 Ships of the Caroline class

C-class cruisers
Ships built in Plymouth, Devon
1915 ships
World War I cruisers of the United Kingdom
Maritime incidents in 1916